Mr. Lee may refer to:

Mr. Lee (rapper), (born Leroy Haggard Jr.), American hip house DJ, rapper and record producer from Chicago
Mr. Lee (record producer), (born Leroy Williams Jr.), American hip hop producer and entrepreneur from Houston
Mr. Lee (restaurant), a Chinese restaurant chain
"Mr. Lee" (song), by The Bobbettes